Nová Ves is a municipality and village in Strakonice District in the South Bohemian Region of the Czech Republic. It has about 90 inhabitants.

Administrative parts
Villages of Lhota pod Kůstrým and Víska are administrative parts of Nová Ves.

References

Villages in Strakonice District